The Portrait of Folco Portinari  is a painting by the German painter Hans Memling, dating to c. 1490.  It is displayed in the Uffizi Gallery, in Florence.

History
The painting, for a period, was attributed to Antonello da Messina. It is documented for the first time at the Uffizi in 1863, assigned to an anonymous Flemish artist. Later, together with three other paintings in the gallery (Portrait of Benedetto Portinari, Portrait of an Unknown Man in a Landscape and Man with a Letter), the painting was attributed to Memling due to its high quality.

Of the four, the portrait of Folco Portinari is considered the latest one. The identification with Folco Portinari is anyway hypothetical.

References and sources

Sources

1490s paintings
Portinari, Folco
Portinari, Folco
Paintings in the collection of the Uffizi